Máximo Garay (10 June 1898 – 8 August 1960) was a Hungarian naturalized Chilean football manager.

Career
Born Miska Garay Magnuzs in Hungary, he naturalized Chilean. He worked for clubs in Argentina and Chile. In addition, he was the manager of both El Salvador and Chile national teams. In 1940, he was the manager of Colo-Colo.

References

External links
 Futbolistas extranjeros en Chile

1898 births
1960 deaths
Sportspeople from Budapest
People from the Kingdom of Hungary
Chilean football managers
Chilean expatriate football managers
Hungarian football managers
Hungarian expatriate football managers
Club Atlético Platense managers
Club Atlético Independiente managers
Club de Gimnasia y Esgrima La Plata managers
San Lorenzo de Almagro managers
Club Deportivo Universidad Católica managers
Colo-Colo managers
El Salvador national football team managers
Chile national football team managers
Magallanes managers
Bádminton F.C. managers
Argentine Primera División managers
Chilean Primera División managers
Hungarian expatriate sportspeople in Argentina
Hungarian expatriate sportspeople in Chile
Chilean expatriate sportspeople in El Salvador
Expatriate football managers in Argentina
Expatriate football managers in Chile
Expatriate football managers in El Salvador
Hungarian emigrants to Chile
Naturalized citizens of Chile